The 3rd Biathlon World Championships were held in 1961 in Umeå, Sweden. The men's 20 km individual and team were the only competitions.

Men's results

20 km individual

Each shot missing the target gave a penalty of 2 minutes.

20 km team

The times of the top 3 athletes from each nation in the individual race were added together.

Medal table

References

1961
Biathlon World Championships
International sports competitions hosted by Sweden
1961 in Swedish sport
Sports competitions in Umeå
Biathlon competitions in Sweden
February 1961 sports events in Europe